The 2010 Masters (officially the 2010 PokerStars.com Masters) was a professional non-ranking snooker tournament that took place between 10 and 17 January 2010 at the Wembley Arena in London, England. This was the first time that the Masters was sponsored by PokerStars.com.

The final was a repeat of the previous years' final, with Mark Selby playing against the defending championship Ronnie O'Sullivan. Unlike the previous year, Selby won his 2nd Masters title by defeating O'Sullivan 10–9 in the final after trailing 4–1, 5–3 and 9–6.

Field
Defending champion Ronnie O'Sullivan was the number 1 seed with World Champion John Higgins seeded 2. Places were allocated to the top 16 players in the world rankings. Players seeded 15 and 16 played in the wild-card round against the winner of the qualifying event, Rory McLeod (ranked 39), and wild-card selection Jimmy White (ranked 56). Rory McLeod was making his debut in the Masters following his win in the qualifying tournament; this to date is the last Masters to feature such qualifying tournament and the wildcard round in general.

Prize fund
The breakdown of prize money for this year is shown below:

Qualifying stage
Winner: £2,000
Runner-up: £680
Semi-final: £250
Quarter-final: £105

Televised stage

Winner: £150,000
Runner-up: £75,000
Semi-final: £34,000
Quarter-final: £16,000
Last 16: £14,000
Last 18 (wild-cards): £3,500

Highest break: £10,000
Maximum break: £25,000
Total: £486,000

Wild-card round
In the preliminary round the wild-card players played the 15th and 16th seeds:

Main draw

Final

Qualifying
The 2009 Masters Qualifying Event was held between 26 and 29 October 2009 at Pontins in Prestatyn, Wales. Rory McLeod earned a wild-card to the 2010 Masters, beating Andrew Higginson 6–1 in the final.

Century breaks

Televised stage centuries
A total of 20 century breaks were made during the event.

 140, 121  Stephen Maguire
 140, 101  Neil Robertson
 132, 107, 102  Mark Williams
 129, 112, 109  Mark Selby
 122, 114, 106, 106, 101  Ronnie O'Sullivan
 114, 104  Stephen Hendry
 114  Mark Allen
 106, 100  Shaun Murphy

Qualifying stage centuries
A total of 12 centuries were made during qualifying for the event.

 137  Barry Pinches
 125  Judd Trump
 120  Bjorn Haneveer
 118  Matthew Selt
 116  Jimmy White
 111, 109  Anthony Hamilton
 107, 100  Jamie Burnett
 106  David Gray
 105  Rory McLeod
 100  Robert Milkins

References

2010
2010 in snooker
2010 sports events in London
2010 in English sport
January 2010 sports events in the United Kingdom